, provisional designation , is a stony asteroid of the Apollo group, classified as near-Earth object and potentially hazardous asteroid, approximately 1 kilometer in diameter. It was discovered on 1 May 1989, by American astronomer Eleanor Helin at the U.S. Palomar Observatory in California. On 27 May 2022, the asteroid made a close approach  from Earth. During the close approach, optical observations detected signs of an orbiting satellite, which was later confirmed by radar imaging at NASA's Goldstone Solar System Radar in California.

Orbit and classification 

The S-type asteroid orbits the Sun at a distance of 0.9–2.6 AU once every 2 years and 4 months (861 days). Its orbit has an eccentricity of 0.48 and an inclination of 15° with respect to the ecliptic. The first observation was made at the discovering observatory in April 1989, extending the asteroid's observation arc by 1 month prior to its discovery observation.

Physical characteristics 

During its discovery in May 1989, radiometric observations for this asteroid at Arecibo and Goldstone Observatory rendered a rotation period of less than 12 hours. According to the survey carried out by the NEOWISE mission of NASA's Wide-field Infrared Survey Explorer, the asteroid measures 0.93 kilometers in diameter and its surface has a high albedo of 0.31–0.32, while the Collaborative Asteroid Lightcurve Link assumes a standard albedo for stony asteroids of 0.20 and calculates a diameter of 1.18 kilometers, based on an absolute magnitude of 17.0.

Naming 

As of 2022,  remains unnamed.

References

External links 
 Asteroid Lightcurve Database (LCDB), query form (info )
 Dictionary of Minor Planet Names, Google books
 Asteroids and comets rotation curves, CdR – Observatoire de Genève, Raoul Behrend
 
 
 

007335
Discoveries by Eleanor F. Helin
007335
19890501
007335
007335